Solveig Skaugvoll Foss (born 5 December 1996) is a Norwegian politician for the Socialist Left Party.

She served as a deputy representative to the Parliament of Norway from Oslo during the term 2017–2021, meeting during 204 days of parliamentary session.

References

1996 births
Living people
Politicians from Oslo
Deputy members of the Storting
Socialist Left Party (Norway) politicians
21st-century Norwegian women politicians
21st-century Norwegian politicians
Place of birth missing (living people)
Women members of the Storting